Walter L. Isenberg (born 1958) is an American businessman and investor. He co-founded Sage Hospitality Resources and serves as the company's President and Chief Executive Officer.

Biography
Isenberg grew up in Kansas City, Missouri.  At the age of 14 he started working as a dishwasher at a country club while in high school where he was introduced to the hospitality industry. He graduated from Cornell University with a degree in hospitality management. After college, he took a position with the Atlanta-based Southern Host Hotel where he quickly developed a reputation as a troubleshooter turning around struggling hotels.  After having worked in seven different cities over a period of four years, he and fellow Cornell alumni and friend, Zachary Neumeyer founded Sage Hospitality Resources in 1984. Instead of owning hotels outright, Sage Hospitality initially focused on operating, managing, and market positioning of hotels for their owners. In the 1990s, they began to acquire hotels outright expanding beyond hotel management.  Since their founding, Sage Hospitality has turned around dozens of distressed properties and supervised the restoration and conversion of historically significant buildings located in large urban centers to hotel use. Sage has a presence in 20 states owns and operates more than 77 hotels and 14 independent restaurants. Sage serves the full range of hotels from urban full-service independent or branded hotels to smaller select-service hotels.[1] The company has two divisions: Sage Hotels and Sage Restaurant Group.[1]

Isenberg serves on the boards of The Children's Hospital Foundation, the Denver Metro Convention & Visitors Bureau; The Downtown Denver Partnership; Colorado Concern; > Since March 2014, he has been a Director of American Hotel And Lodging Association.

Personal life
He is married to Christie Isenberg and they have two daughters together, Nicole and Tirunesh.

Awards 

 2017 - Hospitality Design Platinum Circle Award
 2014, 2013 - Denver Business Journal's Power Book Nominee - Travel & Tourism
 2010 - Inducted into the Denver & Colorado Tourism Hall of Fame
 2009 - Maverick Thinker Award from Denver's Urban Peak
 2004 - Rickenbaugh Community Service Award

References

1958 births
American real estate businesspeople
American chief executives of travel and tourism industry companies
Cornell University School of Hotel Administration alumni
Living people